Birau, is a type of small dugout canoe of the Sama-Bajau people of the Philippines. They are made from a single log hollowed into a canoe with a rounded bottom. The prow and stern of the vessel usually has knob-like protrusions. A smaller wider variant without these knobs is known as bitok. They are sometimes equipped with two outrigger floats. They are very similar to the buggoh, differing only in that the prow and the stern of the birau slope inward.

See also
 Junkun
 Owong
 Vinta
 Djenging
 Garay (ship)
 Balangay

References 

Indigenous ships of the Philippines
Canoes